The Blue Train travels an approximately  journey in South Africa between Pretoria and Cape Town. It is one of the most luxurious train journeys in the world. It boasts butler service, two lounge cars (smoking and non-smoking), an observation car, and carriages with gold-tinted picture windows, in soundproofed, fully carpeted compartments, each featuring its own en-suite (many of which are equipped with a full-sized bathtub). The service is promoted as a "magnificent moving five-star hotel" by its operators, who note that kings and presidents have travelled on it.

History
The Blue Train's origins date back to 1923, when the Union Express commenced between Johannesburg and Cape Town, it was named the Union Limited in the reverse direction. The Union Express introduced luxury features such as a dining saloon in 1933 and air-conditioned carriages from Metro-Cammell in 1939.

After being withdrawn in 1942 due to World War II, the service returned in 1946. With the reintroduction of the train, the colloquial "blue train" moniker, a reference to the blue-painted steel carriages introduced in 1937, was formally adopted as the new name.

In 1955 it began to be hauled by 3E electric locomotives between Cape Town and Touws River. In 1959 a Wegmann & Co built air-conditioned dining and kitchen car was inserted into each set. In September 1972, two 16 carriage sets built by Union Carriage & Wagon were introduced. In 1997 it was refurbished and relaunched. In 2015, Class 20Es 20-031 and 20-032 were assigned to the train replacing Class 18Es.

Route

Prior to 2002 the Blue Train operated on four distinct routes:
the main Pretoria-Cape Town service
the scenic "Garden Route" from Cape Town to Port Elizabeth
to Hoedspruit, along the western edge of Kruger National Park
to Zimbabwe's Victoria Falls

By 2004 the last two routes had been suspended, the former due to lack of patronage, the latter due to erratic rail rates being charged for access to the network of financially strapped Zimbabwe. As of 2007 the only regular route in operation was Pretoria-Cape Town; however special package tours were offered to Durban or the Bakubung Game Lodge. Other variations on the route have been offered.

Shosholoza Meyl, the long-distance train division of the Passenger Rail Agency of South Africa, operates trains on the same Pretoria to Cape Town route. One train per day runs in each direction, but this not a 'luxury' service. As of 2009, the Blue Train is operated by Luxrail, a division of Transnet Freight Rail.

Operations require two Blue Trains in operation: one operates in the northern direction and the other in the southern direction, allowing for daily departures from both ends of the route. The first train accommodates 74 guests in 37 suites. The second accommodates 58 guests in 29 suites and features a conference or observation car at the back of the train.

See also
Rovos Rail

References

Further reading

External links

Luxury trains
Named passenger trains of South Africa
Railway services introduced in 1923
Transnet
1923 establishments in South Africa